Capitaine Achab (in English, Captain Ahab) is a 2004 French short film directed by Philippe Ramos. It is an interpretation of Herman Melville's 1851 novel Moby-Dick. The film follows a young Achab and the events that inspire his eventual journey to the sea. The film was presented at the Cannes Film Festival and Pantin in 2004.

In 2007 a full-length (100 min.) version was released.

Cast
Short version
 Valérie Crunchant : Louise
 Frédéric Bonpart : Achab
 Alexis Locquet : Young Achab
 Dominique Blanc : Anna
 Aristide Demonico : Achab's father
 Aymeric Descrèpes : Starbuck
 Mona Heftre : Achab's Aunt
 Grégory Gadebois : The guardian
Long version
 Denis Lavant : Capitaine Achab
 Virgil Leclair : Young Achab
 Dominique Blanc : Anna
 Bernard Blancan : Will Adams
 Hande Kodja : Louise
 Jean-François Stévenin : Achab's father
 Mona Heftre : Rose
 Philippe Katerine : Henry
 Jacques Bonnaffé : Starbuck
 Carlo Brandt: Mulligan
 Jean-Paul Bonnaire : Pastor
 Jean-Christophe Bouvet : the king of England
 Pierre Pellet : Jim Larsson
 Lou Castel : Dr Hogganbeck
 Denis Déon : Sam
 Adama Doubia : le colleur d'affiches
 Gérard Essomba : Carpenter
 Guillaume Verdier : Ismaël
 Grégory Gadebois : Warehouse Guardian
 Dorothée Brugère : la blanchisseuse n°1
 Samantha Mialet : la blanchisseuse n°2

Awards
"Prix de la presse 2003" at the "Festival du film court de Paris"

References

External links

DVD toile (French)
 2007 film

2004 films
2000s French-language films
Films based on Moby-Dick
French short films
Films directed by Philippe Ramos
2000s French films